The grand prix de l'Imaginaire (GPI, "grand prize of the Imaginary"), until 1992 the grand prix de la science-fiction française, is a French literary award for speculative fiction, established in 1972 by the writer Jean-Pierre Fontana as part of the science fiction convention of Clermont-Ferrand.

Initially purely a science fiction award, the award's scope was widened to encompass all fields of speculative fiction in 1992. From 2000 to 2010 it was awarded as part of the Utopiales festival in Nantes. It is now part of the Étonnants Voyageurs festival of Saint-Malo.

Winners 
Apart from the awards listed here, there are also categories for best new novel, foreign youth novel, translations, comic, manga, and others.

French novel
 1974 : Michel Jeury, Le Temps incertain
 1975 : Philippe Curval, L'Homme à rebours
 1976 : Philip Goy, Le Livre machine
 1977 : Michel Demuth, Les Galaxiales
 1978 : Pierre Pelot, Delirium circus 
 1979 : , La Maison du cygne
 1980 : , L'Épouvante
 1981 : Serge Brussolo, Vue en coupe d'une ville malade
 1982 : Élisabeth Vonarburg, Le Silence de la cité
 1983 : Pierre Billon, L'Enfant du cinquième nord
 1984 : Jean-Pierre Hubert, Le Champ du rêveur
 1985 : André Ruellan, Mémo
 1986 : Joël Houssin, Les Vautours
 1987 : Antoine Volodine, Rituel du mépris, variante Moldscher
 1988 : Serge Brussolo, Opération serrures carnivores
 1989 : Joëlle Wintrebert, Le Créateur chimérique
 1990 : Jean-Pierre Andrevon, Sukran
 1991 : Francis Berthelot, Rivage des intouchables
 1992 : Joël Houssin, Le Temps du twist
 1993 : Ayerdhal, Demain, une oasis
 1994 : Pierre Bordage, Les Guerriers du silence
 1995 : Laurent Genefort, Arago
 1996 : Maurice G. Dantec, Les Racines du mal
 1997 : Jean-Marc Ligny, Inner City
 1998 : Serge Lehman, F.A.U.S.T.
 1999 : Roland C. Wagner, Les Futurs Mystères de Paris
 2000 : , Le Successeur de pierre
 2001 : , Bouvard, Pécuchet et les savants fous
 2002 : Pierre Pevel, Les Ombres de Wielstadt
 2003 : Michel Pagel, Le Roi d'août
 2004 : Fabrice Colin, Dreamericana
 2005 : Ayerdhal, Transparences
 2006 : Alain Damasio, La horde du contrevent
 2007 : Catherine Dufour, Le Goût de l'immortalité
 2008 : Wayne Barrow, Bloodsilver 
 2009 : Georges-Olivier Châteaureynaud, L'Autre rive
 2010 : , Le Déchronologue
 2010 : (Étonnants Voyageurs) , Chien du heaume
 2011 : Michel Jeury, May le Monde
 2012 : Roland C. Wagner, Rêves de Gloire
 2013 : Thomas Day, Du sel sous les paupières
 2014 : , Anamnèse de Lady Star
 2015 : , Aucun homme n'est une île
 2016 : Laurent Genefort, Lum'en
 2017 : , Latium 
 2018 : Sabrina Calvo, Toxoplasma
 2019 : Patrick K. Dewdney, Le Cycle de Syffe, tomes 1 & 2

French short fiction
 1974 : Gérard Klein, Réhabilitation
 1975 : Dominique Douay, Thomas
 1976 : Daniel Walther, Les Soleils noirs d'Arcadie
 1977 : Philip Goy, Retour à la terre, définitif
 1978 : Yves Frémion, Petite mort, petite amie
 1979 : Serge Brussolo, Funnyway
 1980 : Pierre Giuliani, Les Hautes plaines
 1981 : Bruno Lecigne, La Femme-escargot allant au bout du monde
 1982 : Jean-Pierre Hubert, Gélatine
 1983 : Jacques Mondoloni, Papa Ier
 1984 : Jean-Claude Dunyach, Les Nageurs de sable
 1985 : René Reouven, Un fils de Prométhée ou Frankenstein dévoilé
 1986 : Charles Dobzynski, Le Commerce des mondes
 1987 : Gérard Klein, Mémoire vive, mémoire morte
 1988 : Francis Berthelot, Le Parc zoonirique
 1989 : Richard Canal, Étoile
 1990 : Colette Fayard, Les Chasseurs au bord de la nuit
 1991 : Raymond Milési, Extra-muros
 1992 : Alain Dorémieux, M'éveiller à nouveau près de toi, mon amour
 1993 : Wildy Petoud, Accident d'amour
 1994 : Katherine Quenot, Rien que des sorcières
 1995 : Serge Lehman, Dans l'abîme
 1996 : Georges-Olivier Châteaureynaud, Quiconque
 1997 : Serge Lehman, Le Collier de Thasus
 1998 : Jean-Claude Dunyach, Déchiffrer la trame
 1999 : Jean-Jacques Nguyen, L'Amour au temps du silicium
 2000 : Fabrice Colin, Naufrage mode d'emploi
 2001 : Jeanne Faivre d'Arcier, Monsieur boum boum
 2002 : Olivier Paquet, Synesthésie
 2003 : Robert Belmas et Claire Belmas, À n'importe quel prix
 2004 : Jean-Jacques Girardot, Dédales virtuels
 2005 : Mélanie Fazi, Serpentine
 2006 : Claude Ecken, Le monde tous droits réservés
 2007 : Sylvie Lainé, Les yeux d'Elsa
 2008 : Catherine Dufour, L'Immaculée conception
 2009 : Jeanne-A Debats, La Vieille Anglaise et le Continent  
 2010 : , Le Diapason des mots et des misères (collection) 
 2010 : (Étonnants Voyageurs) , Les Trois livres qu'Absalon Nathan n'écrira jamais 
 2011 : Laurent Genefort, Rempart
 2012 : Christophe Langlois, Boire la tasse (collection) 
 2013 : Bernard Quiriny, Une collection très particulière (collection)
 2014 : , Sept secondes pour devenir un aigle (collection)
 2015 : Sylvie Lainé, L'Opéra de Shaya (collection)
 2016 : Laurent Genefort, Ethfrag
 2017 : Paul Martin Gal, La Cité des Lamentations  (collection)
 2018 : Alain Damasio, Serf-Made-Man ? ou la créativité discutable de Nolan Peskine
 2019 : Luc Dagenais, La Déferlante des Mères

Foreign-language novel
 1992 : Robert R. McCammon, The Wolf's Hour
 1993 : Garfield Reeves-Stevens, Dark Matter
 1994 : Jack Finney, Time and Again
 1995 : Robert Reed, Down the Bright Way
 1996 : James Morrow, Towing Jehovah
 1997 : Neal Stephenson, Snow Crash
 1998 : Clive Barker, Imajica
 1999 : Valerio Evangelisti, Nicolas Eymerich, Inquisiteur 
 2000 : Orson Scott Card, Seventh Son 
 2001 : Andreas Eschbach, The Carpet Makers
 2002 : J. Gregory Keyes, Newton's Cannon 
 2003 : Jamil Nasir, Tower of Dreams
 2004 : Robert Holdstock, Celtika
 2005 : China Miéville, Perdido Street Station
 2006 : Christopher Priest, The Separation
 2007 : Graham Joyce, The Facts of Life
 2008 : Robert Charles Wilson, Spin
 2009 : Theodore Roszak, The Crystal Child: A Story of the Buried Life 
 2010 : Ian McDonald, King of Morning, Queen of Day
 2010 : (Étonnants Voyageurs) Jack O'Connell, The Resurrectionist
 2011 : Ian McDonald, River of Gods
 2012 : China Miéville, The City & the City
 2013 : Paolo Bacigalupi, The Windup Girl
 2014 : Andrus Kivirähk, The Man Who Spoke Snakish
 2015 : Peter F. Hamilton, Great North Road
 2016 : Andri Snær Magnason LoveStar
 2017 : Ahmed Saadawi, Frankenstein in Baghdad
 2018 : James Morrow, Galápagos Regained
 2019 : Ben H. Winters, Underground Airlines
 2020 : Maryna and Serhiy Dyachenko, Vita Nostra
 2021 : John Crowley, Ka: Dar Oakley in the Ruin of Ymr
 2022 : Mariana Enriquez, Nuestra parte de noche

Foreign-language short fiction 
 1995 : Nancy Kress, Beggars in Spain
 1996 : Dan Simmons, The Great Lover
 1997 : Robert J. Sawyer, You See But You Do Not Observe
 1998 : Poppy Z. Brite, Calcutta, Lord of Nerves
 1999 : John Crowley, Great Work of Time
 2000 : Jonathan Carroll, Uh-Oh City
 2001 : Terry Bisson, Macs
 2002 : Christopher Priest The Discharge
 2003 : Graham Joyce, Leningrad Nights
 2004 : Peter S. Beagle, The Rhinoceros Who Quoted Nietzsche and Other Odd Acquaintances (as a collection)
 2005 : Paul Di Filippo, Sisyphus and the Stranger
 2006 : Jeffrey Ford, Exo-skeleton town
 2007 : Lucius Shepard, Aztechs
 2008 : Ursula K. Le Guin, Four Ways to Forgiveness (as a collection)
 2009 : Kelly Link, Stranger Things Happen / Magic for Beginners (as a collection)
 2010 : Neil Gaiman, Fragile Things (as a collection)
 2010 : Greg Egan, Oceanic (story collection) and the story Ted Chiang, Exhalation
 2011 : Lucius Shepard, Sous des cieux étrangers (French title of a collection)
 2012 : Lisa Tuttle, Objects in Dreams  (as a collection)
 2013 : Ian McDonald, The Little Goddess
 2014 : Nina Allan, The Silver Wind  (as a collection)
 2015 : Paolo Bacigalupi, Pump Six and Other Stories (La Fille flûte et autres fragments de futurs brisés) (as a collection)
 2016 : Ken Liu, The Paper Menagerie (as a collection)
 2017 : Kij Johnson, The Man Who Bridged the Mist
 2018 : Nancy Kress, Danses aériennes
 2019 : Carolyn Ives Gilman, Voyage avec l’extraterrestre

Youth Novel
 1982 : Jean-Pierre Andrevon, La Fée et le géomètre
 1983 : Michel Grimaud, Le Tyran d'Axilane
 1984 : Thérèse Roche, Le Naviluk 
 1985 : Robert Escarpit, L'Enfant qui venait de l'espace 
 1990 : Roger Leloup, Le Pic des ténèbres 
 1991 : Liliane Korb, Temps sans frontières  
 1992 : Yves Coppens and Pierre Pelot, Le Rêve de Lucy 
 1993 : François Coupry, Le Fils du concierge de l'opéra  
 1994 : Alain Grousset, Les Chasse-marée 
 1995 : Clive Barker, The Thief of Always
 1996 : Christopher Pike, Fall into Darkness
 1997 : Raymond Milési, Papa, j'ai remonté le temps 
 1998 : Christian Grenier, Le Cycle du Multimonde 
 1999 : Gérard Moncomble, Prisonnière du tableau ! 
 2000 : Gudule, La Fille au chien noir 
 2001 : Francis Berthelot, La Maison brisée 
 2002 : Danielle Martinigol, Les Abîmes d'Autremer 
 2003 : Elvire, Lorris and Marie-Aude Murail,Golem 
 2004 : Fabrice Colin, Cyberpan 
 2005 : Nathalie Le Gendre, Mosa Wosa
 2006 : Cornelia Funke, Inkheart
 2007 : Timothée de Fombelle and Bartimaeus Sequence Jonathan Stroud (ex aequo)La Vie suspendue 
 2008 : Scott Westerfeld, Uglies
 2009 : Gemma Malley, The Declaration
 2010 : Anne Fakhouri, Le Clairvoyage and La Brume des jours

French Youth Novel 
 2010 (Étonnants Voyageurs) : Victor Dixen, Été mutant (le Cas Jack Spark - 1)  
 2011 : François Place, La Douane volante 
 2012 : Frédéric Petitjean, La Route des magiciens 
 2013 : Hervé Jubert, Magies secrètes 
 2014 : Victor Dixen, La Malédiction de Boucle d'or (Animale - 1) 
 2015 : Jean-Luc Marcastel, La Seconde Vie de d'Artagnan 
 2016 : Christelle Dabos, La Passe-miroir (tomes 1 et 2) 
 2017 : Roxane Dambre, Scorpi (tomes 1 à 3) 
 2018 : Ange, Sang maudit 
 2019 : Nathalie Somers, Roslend (tomes 1 à 3) 
 2020 : Judith Bouilloc, L'Arrache-mots 
 2021 : E. S. Green, Steam Sailors (tomes 1 et 2)

French science fiction awards